Hasan Bilal (born 12 March 1998) is a Turkish football player who plays as a midfielder for Vanspor FK.

Professional career
Bilal made his professional debut for Kasımpaşa in a 4-2 Süper Lig win over Çaykur Rizespor on 12 May 2017.

References

External links

Kasımpaşa Profile

1998 births
Footballers from Istanbul
Living people
Turkish footballers
Turkey youth international footballers
Association football midfielders
Galatasaray S.K. footballers
Kasımpaşa S.K. footballers
Ankara Keçiörengücü S.K. footballers
Sakaryaspor footballers
Süper Lig players
TFF First League players
TFF Second League players